Year 230 (CCXXX) was a common year starting on Friday (link will display the full calendar) of the Julian calendar. At the time, it was known as the Year of the Consulship of Agricola and Clementinus (or, less frequently, year 983 Ab urbe condita). The denomination 230 for this year has been used since the early medieval period, when the Anno Domini calendar era became the prevalent method in Europe for naming years.

Events 
 By place 

 Roman Empire 
 Emperor Alexander Severus decides that Thessaly should be a separate province from Macedonia. He increases taxes, in order to maintain the war against the Sassanids, and strengthen the defenses of the Roman Empire.

 Persian Empire 
 King Ardashir I of the Persian Empire invades the Roman province of Mesopotamia, and unsuccessfully besieges the fortress town of Nisibis (Turkey). His army threatens the border outposts of Syria and Cappadocia. 
 Alexander Severus assembles the Roman army, and establishes his headquarters at Antioch. He attempts a diplomatic solution, but the Persians decline and choose war.

 Korea 
 Jobun becomes king of the Korean kingdom of Silla.

 By topic 

 Religion 
 July 21 – Pope Pontian succeeds Pope Urban I, as the 18th pope of Rome.
 Patriarch Castinus succeeds Ciriacus I as patriarch Constantinople.
 Seventy bishops hold the council of the Christian Church of Africa.

Births 
 Gaius Vibius Volusianus, Roman emperor (d. 253)
 Marcus Aurelius Carus, Roman emperor (d. 283)

Deaths 
 May 23 – Urban I, bishop of Rome (b. 175)
 July 9 – Bian, Chinese empress dowager (b. 159) 
 Go Uru, Korean prime minister
 Liang Xi, Chinese official and politician
 Marius Maximus, Roman consul and biographer
 Naehae of Silla, Korean ruler
 Wu Zhi, Chinese official and general (b. 177)
 Zhang Wen, Chinese official and politician (b. 193)
 Zhang Yi, Chinese official and politician (b. 167)
 Zhong Yao, Chinese official and calligrapher (b. 151)

References